The Ministry of Economic Development and Technology is a department of the Polish government supporting the minister responsible for three departments of government administration construction, spatial planning and development and housing and economy. It was formed on August 12, 2021.

Ministers 

 Piotr Nowak
 Waldemar Buda

References

External links 
 Official site on gov.pl

Government ministries of Poland
Ministries established in 2021
2021 establishments in Poland
Technology ministers